Andre L. Adams (born March 11, 1970), better known by his stage name Andre Nickatina, is an American rapper from San Francisco, California. He previously performed under the stage name Dre Dog.

Personal life

Andre Adams was born on March 11, 1970, in San Francisco, and grew up in the city's Fillmore District. He attended the Galileo Academy of Science and Technology but dropped out and claims to have had a D average. Despite his troubled academic career, Andre maintained an honorable position within the school securing a rank of “Cobra Status” signifying his quick wit.

Musical career
Andre Nickatina first appeared on the Bay Area rap scene in 1993 underneath the stage name Dre Dog. He released two albums under the stage name Dre Dog: The New Jim Jones in 1993 and I Hate You With a Passion in 1995. I Hate You With a Passion peaked at #79 on the Billboard Top R&B/Hip-Hop Albums chart and #3  on the Billboard Heatseekers chart. In 1997, Adams changed his  stage name to Andre Nickatina, and released the albums: Cocaine Raps under his own label, Filmoe Coleman Records and Raven in My Eyes, which was released under the Bay Area Independent Rap Label Dogday Records. Unlike his albums released under the name Dre Dog, Cocaine Raps had deeper production values [First Collaborations with Producer Nick Peace]. The album Raven in My Eyes was noted for its production quality and songs that combine  "sequencers and keyboards that buzz and whine" with live instrumentation. That year, he founded his own record label, Filmoe Coleman Records. Nickatina explained in an interview with Strivin magazine that his name change was "for the better" and that he raps because he feels that he is talented enough to do so but not for the sake of popularity.

Soon afterwards, his following three albums, Tears of a Clown (1999), Daiquiri Factory: Cocaine Raps, Vol. 2, The Unreleased [Sold exclusively at shows and appearances] and These R the Tales (the latter three in 2000) gained him notoriety in the West Coast underground rap scene. Mosi Reeves of the San Francisco Bay Guardian noted Nickatina's popularity at a CD release party for another underground Bay Area rapper/producer, Smoov-E; Reeves called Nickatina "a quick-witted rapper who spits as hard as Kurupt does".  A combo CD/movie project, Conversation with a Devil, followed in 2003. Lindsay Welnick, a music critic for SF Weekly, regarded the film as a knockoff of the classic gangster movie Scarface. Nate Denver for the SF Bay Guardian praised the album, though. Another album, The Gift followed in 2005, when the newspaper SF Weekly named Nickatina the "Best Local Hip Hop Legend" of that year. That same year, he would collaborate with Ilych Sato, better known as Equipto, for his 14th studio album titled "Horns and Halos", which would be accompanied by two sequels later that year and in the following year. Also, in 2005, Nickatina won the first annual Bay Area Raps Awards for Best Underground Artist. In 2008, he released A Tale of Two Andres with Mac Dre. Although they released only three songs together ("Andre N Andre", "U Beezy", "My Homeboy's Chevy"), they were close friends and the album was a tribute to his memory. Nickatina's self-entitled 2013 album debuted at #46 on the R&B/Hip-Hop Albums chart and #12 on the Heatseekers Albums chart, and at a time appeared on iTunes' main albums chart, making it his most successful album to date.

In 2020, Nickatina released a line of sneakers called "Killer Whales" with the Clothing Coach. Also in 2020, Nickatina appeared on San Francisco rapper Dregs One's single "Fog Mode" and in the accompanying music video.

Discography

Studio albums

Collaboration albums
Midnight Machine Gun Rhymes and Alibis with Equipto (2002)
Horns and Halos with Equipto (2005)
Gun-Mouth 4 Hire: Horns and Halos 2 with Equipto (2005)
Bullet Symphony: Horns and Halos 3 with Equipto (2006)
A Tale of Two Andres with Mac Dre (2008)
The King and Mr. Biscuits with Smoov-E (2010)
My Middle Name is Crime EP with The Jacka (2010)

Compilation albums
Unreleased (2001)
Hell's Kitchen (2002)
Khantology: Cocaine Raps 1992-2005 (2006)
Khantology 2: Cocaine Raps 1992-2008 (2009)
Cocaine Inc. (Cocaine Raps Vol.1, Vol.2, Vol.3) (2009)

Soundtrack albums
The Gift (2005)
Ugly Money 2: Love It and Count It (2009)

Mixtapes
Green Eyes (2003) 
Tales of II Andre's with Mac Dre (2006)
The Wrath of Khan hosted by Demolition Men (2007)
Where's My Money (2012)

Extended plays
Cupid got Bullets 4 Me (2014)

References

External links 

 

 https://web.archive.org/web/20121015004332/http://www.hiphopcanada.com/2012/10/smoked-out-with-andre-nickatina-interview/

1970 births
Living people
African-American rappers
Hip hop musicians from San Francisco
Rappers from the San Francisco Bay Area
Horrorcore artists
Underground rappers
21st-century American rappers
21st-century African-American musicians
20th-century African-American people